Orange Business, the business services arm of Orange S.A., is a global integrator of communications products and services for multinational corporations.

On 16th February 2023 Orange Business Services got renamed to Orange Business.

Orange Business offers integrated communications products and services to global enterprises in cloud computing, unified communications, collaboration, Big Data, Internet of things, and Artificial Intelligence ; which manage and integrate the complexity of international communications and software applications.

Orange Business was founded on 1st June 2006, through a rebranding and consolidation of the existing France Telecom businesses of Equant and Wanadoo. Orange Business also acquired giants like Business & Decision and Basefarm in recent years who specializes in Analytics, Data Science, Cloud etc.

Operating in over 220 countries and territories, the company employs over 21,000 employees in 166 countries. Over last few years, €700 million were invested in research and development with dedicated 8,000 employees including scientists, engineers, developers, designers, sociologists, and marketers.

Orange Labs is made up of 12 research & development and innovation centers across four continents and has 7,000 patents. It's ranked the 19th most innovative company worldwide.

History

Background of global ownership of Orange: Before May 2000

In May 2000, the Orange brand, through a complex set of mergers and divisions, was acquired and eventually retained by Orange S.A., then a fully owned subsidiary of France Télécom. The chain of mergers that led to the May 2000 acquisition is as follows.

The inception of the Orange brand was in 1990 in the United Kingdom with the formation of "Microtel Communications Ltd" - a consortium initially formed by Pactel Corporation (American), British Aerospace (BAe, now BAE Systems), Millicom, and Matra (French); and later, to be wholly owned by BAe. In July 1991, the Hong Kong-based conglomerate - Hutchison Whampoa through a stock swap deal with BAe, acquired a controlling stake of 65% in Microtel, who by then had won a license to develop a Personal communications network (PCN) network in United Kingdom.

Subsequently, Hutchison renamed Microtel to Orange Personal Communications Services Ltd, and on 28 April 1994, Orange brand was launched in the UK mobile phone market . A holding company structure was adopted in 1995 with the establishment of Orange plc. In April 1996, Orange went public and floated on the London Stock Exchange and NASDAQ, majority owned by Hutchison (48.22%), followed by BAe (21.1%). In June 1996, it became the youngest company to enter the FTSE 100, valued at £2.4 billion. And by July 1997 Orange had gained one million customers.

The stint as a public company came to an end in October 1999, when it was acquired for US$33 Billion by the German conglomerate - Mannesmann AG. The Mannesmann's acquisition of Orange triggered Vodafone to make a hostile takeover bid for the German company. Shortly thereafter, in February 2000, Vodafone acquired Mannesmann for US$183 Billion and, decides to divest Orange as the EU regulations wouldn't allow it to hold two mobile licences. France Télécom in May 2000, announced the acquisition of the global operations of Orange from Vodafone for US$37 Billion and the transaction was completed in August 2000.

Evolution of business services arm of France Telecom: 2000–2006
With the strategic ambition to become an integrated player in managed data networks and IP-based communication and hosting for multinational and local enterprises, France Telecom in January 2000 bought out its two partner's stake (Sprint Nextel and Deutsche Telekom) in the joint venture founded in January 1996- Global One for US$3.88 Billion.

In November 2000, France Telecom acquired a controlling stake of 53% in Dutch-based network operator Equant, part of the SITA group of companies which provided network services to the air transport industry. France Telecom started the process of integrating Global One unit with Equant in 2001 and acquired all outstanding Equant stock by 2005.

Launch of Orange Business Services: 2006–present
On 1 June 2006, France Telecom announced the consolidation of the group's business services operations and rebranded the businesses of Equant and Wanadoo to a new single entity - 'Orange Business Services'. The rebranding exercise created France Telecom SA's global brand for mobile telephony, as well as all broadband and business connectivity services - Orange.

Organisation and operations
It operates in over 220 countries and territories and employs over 30,000 employees in 166 countries. It is organised in the following geographical divisions:

 Europe (based in Paris, France)
 Middle East & Africa 
 Russia 
 Asia Pacific (based in Singapore, Hong Kong, Malaysia, Australia, Japan, India)
 North America (based in Atlanta, USA)
 Latin America (based in Petrópolis, Brazil)

It has five major services centers in Mauritius, Egypt, India , Brazil and France.

Products and services
It offers integrated communication products and services to global enterprises in cloud computing, unified communications, collaboration, Big Data, Internet of things and Artificial Intelligence which manage and integrate the complexity of international communications and software applications.

The service and products portfolio include,

  End-to-end enterprise integration in Data Center Management, Server Management, Network Management, PC life-cycle Management, Security Management and Messaging Administration.
 Datavenue End-to-end single platform for Internet of Things (IoT), Artificial Intelligence, Cognitive Services, Analytics and specialized in Smart Cities
 Deliver and manage complex PBX, IP Voice based services, Unified Communications & Collaboration services
 ITIL-aligned methodology and processes
 Application management capabilities across verticals for CRM applications, IPT applications, Database Integration
 Remote Infrastructure Management services
 WAN-LAN integration, design and management expertise

Case studies 
The complex merger operations that led to ownership of Orange by France Telecom and its subsequent branding is a subject for numerous management case studies on topics like strategic management, brand management, PEST analysis, financing methods of merger and acquisitions and leveraged buyouts.

See also
 Orange S.A.

References

External links
 

Telecommunications companies of France
Orange S.A.
Communications satellite operators